Kurt Vail is an American politician and member of the Republican party. He is a current member of the Connecticut House of Representatives representing Connecticut's 52nd assembly district in the General Assembly.  The district is made up of all of Stafford and Somers.  Vail was first elected in 2014, and is currently serving in his fourth term.

Vail serves on the Insurance and Real Estate Committee. He also sits on the Labor and Public Employees and Public Safety and Security Committees.

Vail also served in the community as a member of the Stafford Board of Education and the Downtown Revitalization Committee. He also serves as a member of the Stafford Board of Selectmen after winning election in 2021.

References

External links
Vail's Official Website

Year of birth missing (living people)
Living people
21st-century American politicians
Republican Party members of the Connecticut House of Representatives
People from Stafford, Connecticut